Mohab El-Kordy (born 21 March 1997) is an Egyptian diver. He competed in the men's 10 metre platform at the 2016 Summer Olympics, where he finished 28th out of 28 competitors.

References

1997 births
Living people
Egyptian male divers
Olympic divers of Egypt
Divers at the 2014 Summer Youth Olympics
Divers at the 2016 Summer Olympics
Divers at the 2020 Summer Olympics